As/Is is a live album by John Mayer, released October 19, 2004, available for download from iTunes and also available as a double-CD release. The albums were released from live concert performances across the United States from the tour following the release of Mayer's second album, Heavier Things. The recordings include five albums-worth of material as sold on iTunes. As of July 2009, the four concert-specific albums were still available on iTunes in the United States, though Volume One is no longer available; Each album has its own artwork. A two-disc compilation was released physically and digitally which features the "best" of the iTunes series, plus an additional song, "Inner City Blues (Make Me Wanna Holler)", a Marvin Gaye cover. In "Inner City Blues", Mayer called upon DJ Logic, the support act of the Heavier Things tour, to join him to perform a turntable solo.

Performing band
The songs all feature Mayer's touring band of the time:

 John Mayer – guitar and vocals
 David LaBruyere – bass guitar
 David Ryan Harris – guitar and backing vocals
 JJ Johnson – drums and percussion
 Michael Chaves – guitar & vocals
 Eric Jacobson – trumpet and dented flugelhorn 
 Chris Karlic – saxophone and flute
 Kevin Lovejoy – keyboards

Cover art for the series
 Volume one features a cut-out silhouette version of Mayer (from the cover of Heavier Things) with two tones of blue. As it is separate from the other volumes, its artwork is rather distinct from the rest.

Artwork for the covers of volumes two, three, four, and five is by the artist Kozyndan.  They feature bunnies in out-of-character situations on their covers, including hanging from helium balloons (two) and in washing machines (three). The bunnies on the cover of four begin as amoeba and diagonally evolve into bunnies. The cover of volume five has several bunnies with their midsections replaced with springs.

The CD release continued the use of bunnies, using the artwork 'Uprisings' by Kozyndan, which has hundreds of bunnies in formation to appear like revered Japanese artwork The Great Wave off Kanagawa. The artwork was originally created as a cover for issue 28 of the magazine Giant Robot. Notably, the CD is considered volume six (the last) of the series, and The Great Wave woodblock printing is the first of a 36-part series of art.

Track listings

As/Is iTunes EP

As/Is iTunes concert releases

As/Is CD release
Volume Six

References

John Mayer live albums
Live album series
2004 live albums
2000s live albums
Columbia Records live albums
Aware Records live albums